So Fresh: The Hits of Autumn 2015 is a compilation album which has 24 tracks that each have charted in the top 40 on the ARIA Singles Chart. The album was released on 20 March 2015, and peaked at number one on the ARIA Compilations Chart where it remained for eight weeks. By the end of April it was certified gold for shipment of 35,000 units.

Track listing

References

2015 compilation albums
So Fresh albums
2015 in Australian music